The Victoria Vikes are the athletic teams that represent the University of Victoria of Victoria, British Columbia, Canada in both men's and women's U Sports. Vikes was previously a longstanding nickname for both the men's teams (previously the Vikings) and women's teams (previously the Vikettes) until it was officially adopted as the teams' name in 1989.

Varsity teams
The Vikes have both men's and women's varsity teams in the following sports:

 Basketball
 Cross country
 Track
 Field Hockey
 Golf
 Rowing
 Rugby union
 Soccer 
 Swimming

Club teams
The Vikes operate a club men's hockey team that competes in the British Columbia Intercollegiate Hockey League.

Championships

U Sports Championships

Men's Basketball (8)
 1979-80, 1980–81, 1981–82, 1982–83, 1983–84, 1984–85, 1985–86, 1996-97

Women's Basketball (9)
 1979-80, 1980–81, 1981–82, 1984–85, 1986–87, 1991–92, 1997–98, 1999-00, 2002–03

Women's Field Hockey (13)
 1984, 1987, 1989, 1991, 1992, 1994, 1995, 1997, 2000, 2002, 2008, 2018, 2019

Men's Soccer (5)
 1975, 1987, 1996, 2004, 2011

Women's Soccer (1)
 2005

Women's Cross-Country (9)
 1980, 1985, 1986, 1987, 1994, 1998, 1999, 2000, 2001

Men's Cross-Country (5)
 1994, 1995, 1996, 1997, 2015

Canadian University National Championships

Women's Rowing (11)
 1997, 1998, 1999, 2000, 2001, 2002, 2003, 2005, 2010, 2011, 2012

Men's Rowing (7)
 1997, 1998, 2000, 2001, 2009, 2010, 2021

Men's Rugby (3)
 1997-98, 1998–99, 2019–20

Men's Rugby 7s (5)
 2011, 2013, 2014, 2015, 2016

Women's Rugby 7s (2)
 2017, 2019

Men's Golf (3)
 2003, 2005, 2006

Women's Golf (1)
 2008

Awards and honors

Canada West Hall of Fame
Kathy Shields: Canada West Hall of Fame - 2019 Inductee 
Nicci Wright, Soccer: Canada West Hall of Fame - 2019 Inductee 
Victoria Vikettes, Basketball: Canada West Hall of Fame - 2019 Inductee

References

External links
 Official website

U Sports teams
University of Victoria
Vikes